A slingshot or catapult is a small hand-powered projectile weapon. The classic form consists of a Y-shaped frame, with two natural rubber strips or tubes attached to the upper two ends. The other ends of the strips lead back to a pouch that holds the projectile. One hand holds the frame, while the other hand grasps the pocket and draws it back to the desired extent to provide power for the projectile—up to a full span of the arm with sufficiently long bands.

Other names include catapult (United Kingdom), peashooter (United States), gulel (India), getis / guleli (Nepal),  (South Africa), or ging, shanghai, pachoonga (Australia and New Zealand), Tirador (Philippines).

Use and history
Slingshots depend on strong elastic materials for their projectile firepower, typically vulcanized natural rubber or the equivalent such as silicone rubber tubing, and thus date no earlier than the invention of vulcanized rubber by Charles Goodyear in 1839 (patented in 1844).  By 1860, this "new engine" had established a reputation for use by juveniles in vandalism. For much of their early history, slingshots were a "do-it-yourself" item, typically made from a forked branch to form the "Y" shaped handle, with rubber strips sliced from items such as inner tubes or other sources of good vulcanized rubber, and firing suitably sized stones.

While early slingshots were most associated with young vandals, they could be effective hunting arms in the hands of a skilled user. Firing projectiles, such as lead musket balls, buckshot, steel ball bearings, air gun pellets, or small nails, a slingshot was capable of taking game such as quail, pheasant, rabbit, dove, and squirrel.  Placing multiple balls in the pouch produces a shotgun effect (even though not very accurate), such as firing a dozen BBs at a time for hunting small birds.  With the addition of a suitable rest, the slingshot can also be used to shoot arrows, allowing the hunting of medium-sized game at short ranges.

While commercially made slingshots date from at latest 1918, with the introduction of the Zip-Zip, a cast iron model, it was not until the post–World War II years that slingshots saw a surge in popularity, and legitimacy.

The Wham-O company, founded in 1948, produced the Wham-O slingshot. It was made of ash wood and used flat rubber bands.

The National Slingshot Association was founded in the 1940s, headquartered in San Marino, California. It organised slingshot clubs and competitions nationwide. Despite the slingshot's reputation as a tool of juvenile delinquents, the NSA reported that 80% of slingshot sales were to men over 30 years old, many of them professionals. John Milligan, a part-time manufacturer of the aluminium-framed John Milligan Special, a hunting slingshot, reported that about a third of his customers were physicians.

The middle 1950s saw two major innovations in slingshot manufacture, typified by the Wrist-Rocket which was produced by the Saunders Archery Co. of Columbus, Nebraska. The Wrist-Rocket was made from bent aluminum alloy rods that formed not only the handle and fork, but also a brace that extended backwards over the wrist, and provided support on the forearm to counter the torque of the bands. The Wrist-Rocket also used surgical rubber tubing rather than flat bands, attached to the backwards-facing fork ends by sliding the tubing ends over the tips of the forks, where it was held by friction or adhered with the addition of liquid rosin.

The early production of the Wrist-Rocket slingshot was a joint effort between Saunders Archery Co., who came up with the trademark and developed the automated forming machinery, and Mark Ellenburg who came up with the basic design. A few years later Mark Ellenburg split away forming his own company called Tru-mark Manufacturing Company. Today Saunders Archery is still a major innovator in the slingshot industry with its line of flatband slingshots which use locking clips for band attachment and  tuning.

Slingshots are also occasionally used in angling to disperse bait over an area of water, so that fish may be attracted.

A home-made derivative of a slingshot also exists, consisting of a rubber balloon cut in half and tied to a tubular object such as the neck of a plastic bottle, or a small pipe. The projectile is inserted through the tube and into the cut balloon, and the user stretches the balloon to launch the projectile. These so-called "balloon guns" are sometimes made as a substitute to ordinary slingshot, and are often used to create the "shotgun" effect with several projectiles fired at once.

Military use
Slingshots have been used as military weapons, but primarily by guerrilla forces due to the easily available resources and technology required to construct one. Such guerrilla groups included the Irish Republican Army; prior to the 2003 invasion of Iraq, Saddam Hussein released a propaganda video demonstrating slingshots as a possible insurgency weapon for use against invading forces.

Slingshots have also been used by the military to launch unmanned aerial vehicles (UAVs).  Two crew members form the fork, with an elastic cord stretched between them to provide power to launch the small aircraft.

On the Battle of Marawi, the soldiers of the Philippine Army's elite Scout Rangers were observed using slingshots with grenades as an improvised mortar to attack Maute and Abu Sayyaf forces.

Sport 

There are competitions, quite popular in Spain, Italy and China.

Dangers
One of the dangers inherent in slingshots is the high probability that the bands will fail. Most bands are made from latex, which degrades with time and use, causing the bands to eventually fail under load. Failures at the pouch end are safest, as they result in the band rebounding away from the user.  Failures at the fork end, however, send the band back towards the shooter's face, which can cause eye and facial injuries. One method to minimize the chance of a fork end failure is to utilize a tapered band, thinner at the pouch end, and thicker and stronger at the fork end. Designs that use loose parts at the fork are the most dangerous, as they can result in those parts being propelled back towards the shooter's face, such as the ball attachment used in the recalled Daisy "Natural" line of slingshots (see image). The band could slip out of the slot in which it rested, and the hard ball in the tube resulted in cases of blindness and broken teeth.  Daisy models using plain tubular bands were not covered in the recall, because the elastic tubing does not cause severe injuries upon failure. Another big danger is the fork breakage; some commercial slingshots made from cheap zinc alloy may break and severely injure shooters' eyes and face.

Legal issues
Though not all but many jurisdictions prohibit the use of arm-braced slingshots. For example, New York Penal law 265.01 defines it as a Class-4 misdemeanor, and Australia also considers them a prohibited weapon.

See also
 Bow and arrow
 Crossbow
 Bullet-shooting crossbow
 Harpoon
 Polespear
 Hawaiian sling
 Sling
 Trebuchet
 Projectile

References

External links 
 

Personal weapons
Primitive weapons
Recreational weapons